Maksym Mykolayovych Kucherenko (born 17 January 2002) is a Ukrainian professional footballer who plays as a centre-forward for Ukrainian club Kremin Kremenchuk.

References

External links
 
 
 

2002 births
Living people
Place of birth missing (living people)
Ukrainian footballers
Association football forwards
FC Kremin Kremenchuk players
Ukrainian First League players
Ukrainian Amateur Football Championship players